The Global Language Monitor (GLM) is a company based in Austin, Texas that  analyzes trends in the English language.

History 
Founded in Silicon Valley in 2003 by Paul J.J. Payack, the GLM describes its role as "a media analytics company that documents, analyzes and tracks cultural trends in language the world over, with a particular emphasis upon International and Global English". In April 2008, GLM moved its headquarters from San Diego to Austin.

In July 2020, GLM announced that 'Covid' was the Top Word of 2020 for Global or International English.

References 

Companies based in Austin, Texas
Human communication
Companies established in 2003
Corpus linguistics
Linguistic research institutes